Owa Obokun Adimula Agunloye-bi-Oyinbo "Bepolonun" was a Yoruba king from the Ijeshaland. He ruled from 1875 to 1893 in a period that witnessed many wars and the birth of Christianity in Ilesa in 1858. He also saw the end of the Kiriji War at Imesi-ile and the return of the Ijesha people to Ilesa in 1893.

References
 J. O. Oni (1972) - A History of Ijeshaland

Yoruba monarchs
19th-century monarchs in Africa
Year of birth missing
Year of death missing